Maurice Lebel,  (December 24, 1909 – April 24, 2006) was a Canadian academic.

Born in Saint-Lin, Quebec, he received a Bachelor of Arts degree in 1928 from Université de Montréal and a Master of Arts degree in 1930 from Université Laval. In 1931, he received a Diplôme d'Études Supérieures in language and classical  literature from the Sorbonne. In 1932, he received a Diploma in language and English literature and a Bachelor of Arts degree in 1935 from the University of London. He received a Ph.D. in education in 1952 and a D.Litt. from the University of Athens in 1957.

From 1937 to 1975, he was a professor of language and Greek literature at Université Laval. From 1957 to 1963, he was the dean of the Faculty of Letters. From 1963 to 1964, he was the president of the Royal Society of Canada (he was made a Fellow in 1947) and was awarded the Pierre Chauveau Medal in 1962.

In 1967, he was made an Officer of the Order of Canada. In 1994, he was made an Officer of the National Order of Quebec.

References
 
 

1909 births
2006 deaths
University of Paris alumni
Canadian literary critics
Canadian university and college faculty deans
Fellows of the Royal Society of Canada
Officers of the Order of Canada
Officers of the National Order of Quebec
People from Lanaudière
Université Laval alumni
Université de Montréal alumni
Alumni of the University of London
Academic staff of Université Laval